Tselyagyun is a rural locality (a selo) in Magaramkentsky District, Republic of Dagestan, Russia. The population was 1,813 as of 2010. There are 17 streets.

Geography 
Tselyagyun is located 19 km northwest of Magaramkent (the district's administrative centre) by road, on the left bank of the Samur River. Togaz and Magaramkent are the nearest rural localities.

Nationalities 
Lezgins live there.

References 

Rural localities in Magaramkentsky District